Niko Ulanovsky (born 6 January 1997) is a German figure skater. He placed fifth at the 2012 Winter Youth Olympics in Innsbruck, Austria and 17th at the 2015 World Junior Championships in Tallinn, Estonia.

Programs

Competitive highlights 
CS: Challenger Series; JGP: Junior Grand Prix

References

External links 
 

1997 births
German male single skaters
Living people
Sportspeople from Gelsenkirchen
Figure skaters at the 2012 Winter Youth Olympics
20th-century German people
21st-century German people